Vladimir Dragovozov (born 1 January 1984, Chișinău, Moldavian SSR) is a Moldavian football midfielder who plays for Academia Chișinău.

He has been featured in Football Manager since 2014.

Club statistics
Total matches played in Moldavian First League: 70 matches - 4 goals

References

External links

Profile at Divizia Nationala
Profile at FC Dacia Chișinău

1984 births
Footballers from Chișinău
Moldovan footballers
Living people
Association football midfielders
FC Dinamo-Auto Tiraspol players
FC Dacia Chișinău players
FC Milsami Orhei players